The 2020–21 Holy Cross Crusaders men's basketball team represented the College of the Holy Cross in the 2020–21 NCAA Division I men's basketball season. The Crusaders, led by second-year head coach Brett Nelson, played their home games at the Hart Center in Worcester, Massachusetts as members of the Patriot League. With the creation of mini-divisions to cut down on travel due to the COVID-19 pandemic, they played in the North Division.

The Crusaders finished the season with a 5–11 record in Patriot League play to finish in last place in the North Division and eighth overall in the conference. On March 2, 2021, they suspended their season after another positive COVID-19 test within the program and did not play in the Patriot League tournament.

Previous season
The Crusaders finished the 2019–20 season 3–29, 2–16 in Patriot League play to finish in the last place. They lost in the first round of the Patriot League tournament to Bucknell.

Roster

Schedule and results 

|-
!colspan=12 style=| Patriot League regular season

|-
!colspan=12 style=| Patriot League tournament
|-

|-

Source

References

Holy Cross Crusaders men's basketball seasons
Holy Cross
Holy Cross Crusaders
Holy Cross Crusaders men's basketball
Holy Cross Crusaders men's basketball